Jack Carpenter is the name of:

Jack Carpenter (American football) (1923–2005), American football player
John M. Carpenter, aka Jack Carpenter, U.S. nuclear engineer

See also
John Carpenter (disambiguation)